"Like to Get to Know You Well" is a song by the English musician Howard Jones released as a single in 1984. It reached number 4 on the UK Singles Chart, and was subsequently included on his remix album The 12" Album. It was later included as a bonus track on CD versions of Jones' second studio album, Dream Into Action (1985).

The sleeve carried the motto "Dedicated to the original spirit of the Olympic Games" as the single was released at the start of the 1984 Summer Olympics. The extended version, subtitled "International Remix", featured Jones singing in English, German and French.

"Like to Get to Know You Well" was featured in the John Cusack movie Better Off Dead, as well as the 2006 video game Grand Theft Auto: Vice City Stories.

Track listing
7"
"Like to Get to Know You Well" – 3:59
"Bounce Right Back" – 4:34

12"
"Like to Get to Know You Well (International Remix)" – 7:42
"Bounce Right Back (Cause + Effect Mix)" – 7:29

Video
Two different videos were made.  The first featured Jones walking around the streets of London greeting members of the public, accompanied by his bandmates of the time. Locations featured included the Sphinx statue and Cleopatra's Needle on Victoria Embankment, Trafalgar Square, and the Sun Luck Chinese restaurant on Macclesfield Street, Soho. 
When the single was released in the US, a new animated video was produced for that market.

References

External links
The Official Howard Jones Website Discography (Singles)THEN SCROLL DOWN

1984 singles
Howard Jones (English musician) songs
Songs written by Howard Jones (English musician)
1984 songs
Song recordings produced by Rupert Hine
Warner Music Group singles